Macbrideola is a genus of Amoebozoa in the family Stemonitidaceae. As of 2015, there are 17 species in the genus.

The genus name of Macbrideola is in honour of Thomas Huston Macbride (1848–1934), who was the tenth president of the University of Iowa and was a naturalist and botanist.

The genus was circumscribed by Henry Clark Gilbert in University of Iowa Studies in  Natural History vol.16 on page 155 in 1934.

Species

Macbrideola andina
Macbrideola argentea
Macbrideola confusa
Macbrideola cornea
Macbrideola decapillata
Macbrideola declinata
Macbrideola dubia
Macbrideola herrerae
Macbrideola indica
Macbrideola lamprodermoides
Macbrideola macrospora
Macbrideola martinii
Macbrideola oblonga
Macbrideola ovoidea
Macbrideola reticulospora
Macbrideola scintillans
Macbrideola synsporos

References

Myxogastria
Amoebozoa genera